Sir Godfrey Henry Oliver Palmer OBE (born 9 April 1940) is a Professor Emeritus in the School of Life Sciences at Heriot-Watt University in Edinburgh, Scotland, and a human rights activist.

He discovered the barley abrasion process while he was a researcher at the Brewing Research Foundation from 1968 to 1977. In 1998, Palmer became the fourth person, and the first European, to be honoured with the American Society of Brewing Chemists Award of Distinction, considered the "Nobel prize of brewing".

In 1989, he became the first black professor in Scotland, becoming a professor emeritus after he retired in 2005. He was knighted in the 2014 New Year Honours.

Early life
Palmer was born in St Elizabeth, Jamaica. His father left home when he was seven years old; after his mother moved to work as a dressmaker in England in 1948, part of the Windrush generation, Palmer grew up in Kingston, Jamaica, in the care of his eight aunts.

He joined his mother in London in March 1955, shortly before his 15th birthday, living at a house on the Caledonian Road. He told the story as a student at Heriot-Watt University that he was a stowaway on a boat from Jamaica to London. Too young to work, he was assessed as educationally subnormal at his first school, and he was sent to Shelborne Road Secondary Modern. His cricketing skill gained him a place on the London Schools' cricket team, and a place at Highbury Grammar School. After leaving school in 1958 with six O-levels and two A-levels, in botany and zoology, he found a job as a junior lab technician at Queen Elizabeth College, London University, working for Professor Garth Chapman. He gained further qualifications studying one day a week at a local polytechnic.

In 1961, Palmer went to the University of Leicester, earning a degree (2:2) in botany in 1964. He sought post-graduate work, and applied to study for an MSc at the University of Nottingham, funded by the Ministry of Agriculture.

Academic career
After an interview with Professor Anna Macleod, he secured a place to study for a PhD in grain science and technology jointly with Heriot-Watt College and the University of Edinburgh, beginning his doctorate in 1965. After completing his PhD thesis entitled Ultra-structure of cereal grains in relation to germination in 1967, he began his research work at the Brewing Research Foundation in Surrey in 1968, where he worked on the science and technology of barley. He moved back to Heriot-Watt University in 1977. He received a Doctorate of Science in 1985, and was offered a personal chair at Heriot-Watt in 1989 after Macleod had retired.

Palmer specialises in grain science and has extensive expertise with barley, sorghum, other cereals and malt, having written a textbook on the subject entitled Cereal Science and Technology. He investigated the processes that turn barley into malt, and he invented the barley abrasion process while at the Brewing Research Foundation. At Heriot-Watt, he and his students worked on brewing using sorghum. He developed a new simple method to detect pre-germination in cereal grains showing difference in amylase actions of individual grains of a barley sample containing different degrees of pre-germination, with results that can be expressed in optical density. In the journal International Brewer and Distiller, it was reported that Palmer had "requested samples of pre-germinated grain as he is developing a new amylase test which will look at the distribution of the enzyme across individual grains in a sample. A small number of grains, with high amylase/pre-germination activity, can cause unexpected storage or processing problems and visual or average analyses do not always identify uneven distribution."

He attracted and received funding to set up the International Centre for Brewing and Distilling at Heriot-Watt University, through initiating contact with the distilling industry. He has also contributed to the Encyclopedia of Seeds and the Encyclopedia of Grain Science, writing the Foreword for the latter.

On 29 April 2021, it was announced that Sir Geoff Palmer had been appointed as the Chancellor of Heriot-Watt University, for an initial term of five years. The role is central to promoting Heriot-Watt's prominence and profile in research in the university's campuses in Scotland, Malaysia and Dubai.

Views

Human rights and racial equality work 
Alongside his academic work, Palmer is also a prominent human rights activist and is involved in a considerable amount of charity work in the community. He wrote a series of articles for the Times Educational Supplement from 1969 to 1971 on way to improve the education of children from ethnic minorities. His book on race relations entitled Mr. White and the Ravens, was first published in 2001, and he contributed an article to The Scotsman entitled 'Stephen Lawrence analysis: Society is more mixed but racism has not gone away - we still have a long way to go' (5 January 2012). Palmer has also authored a book on the history of slavery, The Enlightenment Abolished: Citizens of Britishness (2007), and has spoken out extensively against the slave trade.

In 2007, the Bicentenary of the passage of the Slave Trade Act 1807 by Parliament, which abolished the slave trade, Professor Geoff Palmer was named among the "100 Great Black Britons", as well as on the 2020 updated list.

He serves as the Honorary President of Edinburgh and Lothians Regional Equality Council (ELREC), an Edinburgh-based organisation which works to tackle discrimination and promote human rights and equality in the community, specifically with regard to the nine protected characteristics outlined in the Equality Act 2010. Palmer recently spoke about the Ethnic Coding in NHS Scotland at ELREC's 40th Annual General Meeting.

Views on the Melville Monument and slavery 

During the George Floyd protests, Palmer was a leading proponent of calls to reinterpret the Melville Monument, a large column in St Andrew Square, Edinburgh dedicated to Scottish statesman Henry Dundas, due to his support for "gradual abolition", which delayed the abolition of slave trade by fifteen years. Noting that he did not support the removal of controversial statues "because [they are] part of black history", Palmer instead called on Scottish society to "take down... racism." On 4 April 2021, Palmer appeared on an episode of the BBC's Antiques Roadshow, presenting his antique collection of silver sugar bowls and tongs. On the programme, he described the significance of these items to slavery: "After the 200 year commemoration of the abolition of the slave trade I decided to look at sugar, because it was one of the main reasons for slavery. I thought I would find some evidence of this and acquired these silver items. While slaves were working and dying, people... were consuming the sugar, in those bowls, and with those tongs. To me, those silver bowls tell us the sort of things we do in order to make money, and to have a lifestyle that we think we deserve."

Awards and media
In recognition of his work and achievements in the field of grain science, Palmer was appointed Officer of the Order of the British Empire (OBE) in the 2003 Birthday Honours. In 2008, Palmer became the fourth and only European individual to be honoured with the American Society of Brewing Chemists (ASBC) Award for distinction in scientific research and good citizenship: he received the award in Boston, Massachusetts in 2008. Palmer has been awarded Honorary Doctorates by Abertay University in 2009, the Open University in 2010, the University of the West Indies in 2015, and Heriot-Watt University in 2015. He was knighted in the 2014 New Year Honours for services to human rights, science, and charity.

In August 2015 Palmer was the guest of interviewer Jim Al-Khalili on the BBC Radio 4 programme The Life Scientific.

In December 2022, with the Lord President of the Court of Session, Lord Carloway,  Palmer unveiled a plaque commemorating the 1778 Knight v Wedderburn case, which ruled that slavery was incompatible with Scots law.

Personal life
Palmer has lived in the town of Penicuik in Midlothian since 1977. He is married to educational psychologist Margaret Palmer and has three children.

References

External links
 "Audience with Professor Sir Godfrey Henry Oliver Palmer OBE by Sylbourne Sydial on January 1, 2014", YouTube.

1940 births
Living people
Academics of Heriot-Watt University
Alumni of Heriot-Watt University
Alumni of the University of Edinburgh
Alumni of the University of Leicester
Knights Bachelor
Migrants from British Jamaica to the United Kingdom
Officers of the Order of the British Empire
People from Midlothian
Scottish human rights activists
Scottish non-fiction writers